Windmüller (also appearing in the diaspora variants Windmueller and Windmiller) is a German language occupational or status surname for the owner of a windmill and may refer to:
Bigna Windmüller (born 1991), Swiss ski jumper
Gino Windmüller (born 1989), German footballer
Sabrina Windmüller (born 1987), Swiss ski jumper
Steven Windmueller, American scholar

See also 
 Muller
 Mueller
 Müller (surname)

References 

German-language surnames
Yiddish-language surnames
Occupational surnames
Surnames from status names